Tadeusz Wojciech Maklakiewicz, (20 October 1922, Mszczonów – 24 March 1996, Warsaw) was a Polish composer, music educator, activist and jurist.

Maklakiewicz came from a family of musical traditions, being his brothers John and Francis composers. He studied law at the Jagiellonian University between 1945 and 1949, and then musical composition under the direction of Tadeusz Szeligowski at the National Academy of Music in Warsaw between 1954 and 1958. He worked at the State Music Publishing House in Kraków, in the Office Live ARTOS, at the Central Clinic Amateur Artistic Movements (CPARA) in the 1950s, and in the 1960s at the Polish Radio in Warsaw.

References

1922 births
1996 deaths
Polish composers
Academic staff of the Academy of Music in Kraków
Jagiellonian University alumni
Chopin University of Music alumni
People from Żyrardów County
20th-century composers